Max Roqueta (Argelliers, December 8, 1908 – June 22, 2005) was one of the most famous contemporary Occitan writers. A physician, he was also an activist (he had been president of the Institut d'Estudis Occitans from 1952 to 1957).

Works

Prose
 Secrèt de l’èrba (1934)
 Sòmnis dau matin (1940)
 Sòmnis de la nuòch (1942)
 L’Ataüt d’Arnautz Daniel (1949)
 La Pietat dau matin (1963)
 Vèrd Paradís (1961)
 Vèrd Paradís II (1974)
 Lo Maucòr de l'unicòrn (1992)
 D'aicí mil ans de lutz (1995)

Poetry
 Lo Mètge de Cucunhan (1958)
 Lo Manit e los encants (1996)
 Tota la sabla de la mar (1997)
 Lo Corbatàs roge (1997)

References

External links
  a webstite devoted to Max Rouquette
 J-F. Brun's pages about Occitan literature
 Montpellier University's Servici de la lenga occitana
 Exhibition Max Rouquette
 Obituary in Libération

Occitan-language writers
1908 births
2005 deaths
Commandeurs of the Ordre des Arts et des Lettres